Below is a list of all the power plants installed and operated by the central, private and state government of Telangana.

Non-renewable

Thermal power 

Thermal power is the predominant source of power in Telangana state. There are different types of thermal power plants based on the fuel used to generate the steam, such as coal, gas or diesel.

Renewable

Hydroelectric 

This is a list of hydroelectric power plants in Telangana.

Solar 

This is a list of all solar power plants in Telangana.

Gas power generation 

Shankarampalli Gas based power generation station is presently not working.

References

External links 
 Bhadradri Power Plant 
 TS Genco commissions units 3 & 4

 
Power stations
Telangana
Economy of India lists